Hopewell Township is a township in Beaver County, Pennsylvania, United States, and a suburb of Pittsburgh. The population was 13,489 at the 2020 census. It is part of the Pittsburgh metropolitan area.

Geography
Hopewell Township is located along the southeastern boundary of Beaver County.

Since 1987, Hopewell has been home to a  RIDC industrial park.

Surrounding neighborhoods
Hopewell Township has seven borders.  It encloses the city of Aliquippa on three sides and the borough of South Heights to the southeast.  Where not shared with these two communities, the eastern boundary of the township follows the Ohio River.  Other borders include the townships of Independence to the southwest, Raccoon in the northwestern corner, Center to the north and northwest, and the Allegheny County townships of Crescent and Moon to the southeast.

Demographics 

As of the census of 2000, there were 13,254 people, 5,446 households, and 3,926 families residing in the township.  The population density was 783.7 people per square mile (302.6/km2).  There were 5,636 housing units at an average density of 333.2/sq mi (128.7/km2).  The racial makeup of the township was 91.81% White, 7.34% African American, 0.01% Native American, 0.32% Asian, 0.02% Pacific Islander, 0.05% from other races, and 0.45% from two or more races. Hispanic or Latino of any race were 0.49% of the population.

There were 5,446 households, out of which 27.1% had children under the age of 18 living with them, 59.0% were married couples living together, 10.1% had a female householder with no husband present, and 27.9% were non-families. 25.4% of all households were made up of individuals, and 13.4% had someone living alone who was 65 years of age or older.  The average household size was 2.41 and the average family size was 2.88.

In the township, the population was spread out, with 21.2% under the age of 18, 5.2% from 18 to 24, 27.9% from 25 to 44, 24.0% from 45 to 64, and 21.8% who were 65 years of age or older.  The median age was 42 years. For every 100 females there were 89.1 males.  For every 100 females age 18 and over, there were 85.7 males.

The median income for a household in the township was $42,065, and the median income for a family was $52,521. Males had a median income of $38,380 versus $25,851 for females. The per capita income for the township was $20,802.  About 4.6% of families and 6.0% of the population were below the poverty line, including 7.6% of those under age 18 and 7.8% of those age 65 or over.

Sports
One-time National Football League player and Hall-of-Famer Tony Dorsett played football for the Hopewell Vikings, setting several records during his high school career, then moving to the Pitt Panthers, and the Dallas Cowboys and Denver Broncos of the NFL, setting even more records and ensuring his enshrinement into the Pro Football Hall of Fame.

Former Jacksonville Jaguar Paul Posluszny was a standout running back and linebacker at Hopewell, before attending Penn State. While at Penn State he was a two-time All-American, two-time Bednarik Award winner, and 2005 recipient of the Dick Butkus award for best collegiate linebacker. After being drafted by the Bills, he spent four seasons in Buffalo before moving to the Jacksonville Jaguars where he played until 2017.
 
In 2002, the Hopewell High School's football team, the Vikings, won the state championship.

U.S. Olympic volleyball player Christa Harmotto is from Hopewell and attended Hopewell High School, where she led the women's volleyball team to win a state championship in 2004. In the Olympics, she took home a silver medal in 2012 and a bronze medal in 2016, when she served as team captain. She attended Penn State University and played volleyball from 2005 to 2008.

USAir Flight 427

On September 8, 1994, USAir Flight 427 crashed in Hopewell Township, near the city of Aliquippa, as it was preparing to land at Pittsburgh International Airport, killing all 127 passengers and five crew members on board. The cause was traced to the Boeing 737's rudder system.

References

External links
 Township website

Populated places established in 1770
Townships in Beaver County, Pennsylvania
1770 establishments in Pennsylvania